Duke Ernest I of Brunswick-Göttingen ( – 24 April 1367) was a member of the Guelph dynasty and was Duke of Brunswick-Göttingen from 1344 until his death.

Life 
Ernest was a son of Duke Albert II of Brunswick-Wolfenbüttel-Göttingen and his wife, Rixa of Werle.  In the division of 1286, his father had received the Principality of Göttingen and in 1292, he inherited Principality of Brunswick-Wolfenbüttel from his childless brother William I.  After his father's death in 1318, Ernest's older brother Otto the Mild took up government.  After Otto died childless in 1344, Ernest and his older brother Magnus I divided the Duchy.  Ernest received the Principality of Göttingen, which would remain separated from the rest of Brunswick for a while.

The principality of Göttingen, also known as the Upper Forest, was the poorest of the Welf principalities. It consisted at this time of the former County of Northeim, the cities of Göttingen, Uslar, Dransfeld, Munden and Gieselwerder and one half of Moringen.  The city of Brunswick remained shared property of the various Dukes of Brunswick.

In 1339, Ernest married Elizabeth, a daughter of Landgrave Henry II "the Iron" of Hesse.  With her, he had at least six children.  The best known of these is his successor, Otto I.  A younger son joined the clergy.  Around the year 1364, Ernest handed some of the government business to his son Otto I.  After Ernest's death in 1367, Otto I took over completely.

Not much is known about Ernest's rule, unlike his son's time in office.  It is assumed that, like his predecessors, he fought alongside the cities in the area against the noble robber barons who held castles in the area.  In his last years, he mostly lived in peace with his neighbours and had alliances with many of them.  He was only at war with the Bishopric of Hildesheim and its allies, Mainz, Hesse, Waldeck and Hohnstein.

See also 
 House of Welf
 Duchy of Brunswick-Lüneburg

References 

 Dietrich Denecke and Helga-Maria Kühn (eds.): Göttingen. Geschichte einer Universitätsstadt, 3 vols., vol. 1, Göttingen, 1987, 
 Paul Ehrenpfordt: Otto der Quade, Herzog von Braunschweig zu Göttingen (1367 - 1394), Geibel, Hannover, 1913
 Edgar Kalthof: Geschichte des südniedersächsischen Fürstentums Göttingen und des Landes Calenberg im Fürstentum Calenberg 1285–1584, Verlag Otto Zander, Herzberg (Harz)-Pöhlde, 1982,

External links 
 The Guelphs

Footnotes 

Princes of Göttingen
1300s births
1367 deaths
Year of birth uncertain
14th-century German nobility
Old House of Brunswick